The 1965 Dwars door België was the 21st edition of the Dwars door Vlaanderen cycle race and was held on 19 April 1965. The race started and finished in Waregem. The race was won by Alfons Hermans.

General classification

References

1965
1965 in road cycling
1965 in Belgian sport